Monzeki (門跡) were Japanese Buddhist priests of aristocratic or imperial lineage.  The term was also applied to the temples in which they lived. 

An example of a monzeki temple is Daikaku-ji in Kyoto.

References

 

Japanese monarchy